Anthony Banik (born 17 January 1973) is a former Australian rules football player who played in the Australian Football League between 1990 and 1994 for the Richmond Football Club.

Banik went on to be player-coach for West Adelaide in the South Australian National Football League, then Sale, then led the DWWWW Allies to a Premiership in the Alberton Football Netball League in 2003.

Career
Banik was the #1 pick in the 1989 VFL draft and made his AFL debut for Richmond in Round 3 of the 1990 season against the reigning premiers  on 14 April at Princes Park. He collected 14 kicks, 2 handballs and 1 mark as the Tigers went down by 30 points, 10.21 (81) to 15.21 (111).

During his time at Richmond, Banik contracted chronic fatigue syndrome which limited his on-field availability. He recovered from the illness but was eventually delisted by the club following the 1994 season. He won the Richmond reserves best and fairest award in 1994.

Banik then moved to Adelaide to play for West Adelaide in the South Australian National Football League in 1995. He won their best & fairest award in his debut season with the club, and again in 1997.

He coached Gippsland Football League club Sale in 2000 and 2001.

References

 Hogan P: The Tigers of Old, Richmond FC, Melbourne 1996

External links

1973 births
Living people
Richmond Football Club players
West Adelaide Football Club players
Sale Football Club coaches
Australian rules footballers from Victoria (Australia)